WCKX (107.5 FM), known on air as "Power 107.5 & 106.3," is a radio station broadcasting an urban contemporary format with a heavy but hit-driven emphasis on current R&B/Hip-Hop product.  The station is licensed to and serves the Columbus, Ohio metropolitan area.  It first began broadcasting in 1993 under the call sign WJZA.  The station is currently owned by Radio One, and highly influenced by the BlackPlanet social networking site. The station serves as the sister station to WHTD.  Its studios are located just north of downtown, but the transmitter is located in downtown atop the Borden Building.

Station history
WCKX was originally assigned the 'WJZA' call sign on November 23, 1993. On December 29, 1997, the WCKX call sign assigned to 106.3 MHz ("Power 106") in London, Ohio (now WJYD) was reassigned to 107.5 FM, while the WJZA call sign was dropped and later picked up by 103.5 FM in Pickerington ("Smooth Jazz 103.5 FM").

Since 2014, WCKX competes directly with iHeart's urban WZCB.

On November 28, 2017, at 10 a.m., WCKX began simulcasting with sister station WBMO, and rebranded as Power 107.5/106.3.

External links
Power 107.5

Urban One stations
CKX
Urban contemporary radio stations in the United States
Radio stations established in 1993
1993 establishments in Ohio